McLean House may refer to:

in the United States 
(by state then city or town)
McLean House (Little Rock, Arkansas), listed on the National Register of Historic Places (NRHP) in Little Rock
Maclean House, University of Chicago residential hall named for Norman Maclean, Chicago, Illinois
Isaac McLean House, Cambridge, Massachusetts, NRHP-listed
John S. McLean House, listed on the NRHP in Iron County
Thomas McLean House, Battenville, New York, NRHP-listed
Henry McLean House, Fayetteville, North Carolina, listed on the NRHP in Cumberland County
Dr. Joseph A. McLean House, Sedalia, North Carolina, listed on the NRHP in Guilford County
B. W. McLean House and Office, Jenks, Oklahoma, listed on the NRHP in Tulsa County
Robert and Lucy McLean House, Grants Pass, Oregon, listed on the NRHP in Josephine County
McLean House (Appomattox, Virginia), a historic house within Appomattox Court House National Historical Park